Julia Haworth is an English actress. She is known for playing the role of Claire Peacock in the ITV soap opera Coronation Street from 2003 to 2011.

Early and personal life
Haworth was born in Burnley, Lancashire. She attended St Christopher's Church of England High School, Accrington and later went to Nelson and Colne College and Manchester University. When she was nine, her mother enrolled her in drama workshops at Burnley Mechanics, and she subsequently joined Burnley Youth Theatre, combining acting roles with her studies.

In 2006, she married her partner Jon Wormald at St Stephen's Church, Burnley. Haworth gave birth to a daughter in July 2008. Her second daughter, Amelie Grace was born on 11 February 2013.

Haworth is a patron of UK–based Epidermolysis bullosa charity DEBRA.

Career
After university, Haworth appeared in series such as Peak Practice and in Merseybeat. She first appeared on Coronation Street on 9 April 2003. It was the fourth role she had auditioned for on the series, and her previous experience with childcare was working on the Mother & Baby counter at Boots. Her last appearance was on 14 January 2011, when her character left Weatherfield widowed to start a new life in France with her son and stepson. From 2018-19, Haworth appeared in the BBC soap opera Doctors in the recurring role of Laura Wade. In 2021, she appeared in the second series of the ITV drama The Bay and in an episode of the BBC series "Call The Midwife".

Filmography

References

External links
 

Living people
People from Burnley
English television actresses
English soap opera actresses
English stage actresses
English radio actresses
English film actresses
Actresses from Lancashire
Year of birth missing (living people)